is a railway station on the Minobu Line of JR Tōkai, located in the city of Chūō, Yamanashi Prefecture, Japan.

Lines
Koikawa Station is served by the JR Tōkai Minobu Line, and is located 77.5 rail kilometers from the southern terminus of the Minobu Line at Fuji Station.

Layout
The station has one side platform serving a single bi-directional track. There is no station building, but only a shelter on the platform. The station is unattended.

Adjacent stations

History
Koikawa Station was opened on August 15, 1929, as a passenger stop on the Fuji-Minobu Line. It was elevated in status to a full station on October 1, 1938. The line came under control of the Japanese Government Railways on May 1, 1941. The JGR became the JNR (Japan National Railway) after World War II. Along with the division and privatization of JNR on April 1, 1987, the station came under the control and operation of the Central Japan Railway Company.

Passenger statistics
In fiscal 2016, the station was used by an average of 215 passengers daily (boarding passengers only).

Surrounding area
Yamanashi University Medical School

See also
 List of Railway Stations in Japan

References

External links

  Minobu Line station information	

Railway stations in Japan opened in 1929
Railway stations in Yamanashi Prefecture
Stations of Central Japan Railway Company
Minobu Line
Chūō, Yamanashi